Oleum was an unincorporated community in Contra Costa County, California, United States, located between the unincorporated town of Rodeo and Tormey. It was a small company town, with housing for Union Oil company workers, hence the name, derived from "petroleum". The refinery still exists. The site is located on the Mexican land grant Rancho El Pinole made to Ygnacio Martinez. A post office operated at Oleum from 1910 to 1951.

References

Unincorporated communities in California
Unincorporated communities in Contra Costa County, California